KPTI is the kernel page-table isolation hardening feature in the Linux kernel to mitigate the Meltdown security vulnerability in Intel and other CPUs.

KPTI may also refer to:

 KPTI (FM), the 2004–2009 callsign of the radio station KXXF, licensed to the city of Winnie, Texas, US
 KREV (FM), a radio station with the callsign KPTI (2002–2004), serving the greater San Francisco Bay Area, California, US
 Karyopharm Therapeutics (NASDAQ: KPTI), in the NASDAQ Biotechnology Index

See also
 KTPI (disambiguation)